This article is about current and past artists of Death Row Records.

#
2nd II None

A
Above the Law

B
Bad Azz

C
CPO Boss Hogg*
Crooked I*

D
Danny Boy
Daz Dillinger
Dr. Dre

J
J. Valentine
J-Flexx
Jewell

K
K-Solo
Kurupt

L
The Lady of Rage
LBC Crew
Lil' C-Style
Lil' Bow Wow
Lisa "Left Eye" Lopes

M
MC Hammer
Michel'le
Miilkbone
Mr. Malik
Mark Morrison

N
Nate Dogg

O
Outlawz
O.F.T.B.

P
Prince Ital Joe

R
RBX
Tha Realest

S
Sam Sneed
Slip Capone
Snoop Doggy Dogg
Soopafly
Spider Loc
Suga Free

T
Techniec
Tha Dogg Pound
The D.O.C.
Tray Deee
Tupac Shakur

Y
YGD Tha Top Dogg
Young Soldierz

See also
Death Row Records
Death Row Records Discography

 
Death Row Records